Quattromed Ltd is one of the leading biotechnology companies in Estonia  providing medical diagnostics services and performing custom research programs for the biopharmaceutical industry. As of March 2009, Icosagen AS is the new business name of the former Quattromed Ltd.

Profile
Quattromed was established in 1999 as a spin-off from Tartu University. It is based in Tartu, Estonia. Employing 80 full-time employees, it has grown into the largest biotechnology company in Estonia. Quattromed started with offering molecular diagnostic services, the activities today cover molecular and clinical diagnostics (Quattromed HTI Laboratories), life science products (Quattromed), latex allergen testing (Quattromed Ltd) and protein production (Quattromed Cell Factory).

Products and services
Quattromed’s activities are divided into three branches: medical diagnostics division, technology development division and life science products division. Its main focus of activities is in gene expression and protein production. In-house proprietary technologies are used combined with extensive process know-how and partnership with academic and industrial groups. Quattromed has three patent applications in its IP portfolio, about ten technology licenses and one trade mark.

Quattromed’s main products are:
FITkit (latex allergen test) and FITkit testing service 
E2Tag epitope tagging technology
MAbs to HIV/SIV proteins, epitope tags
anti-IgG antibodies
QMCF Technology - a propriety protein production technology (further information)

See also

 Biopharmaceutical
 FITkit
 Biologics
 Cell culture
 Genetic engineering
 Molecular biology

References

External links
 Quattromed Ltd. website
 Icosagen's (formerly Quattromed) FITkit and latex allergen testing
 Icosagen's (formerly Quattromed) life science product catalogue

Contract research organizations
Biotechnology companies of Estonia
Pharmaceutical companies established in 1999
1999 establishments in Estonia
Privately held companies
Technology companies of Estonia
Estonian brands
Tartu